Joseph Donald Ture, Jr. (born February 7, 1951) is an American serial killer, rapist, burglar, and kidnapper who murdered at least three women and three children in Minnesota from 1978 to 1980. Originally convicted of a single murder in 1981, his more complete exposure occurred in the late 1990s based upon multiple reinvestigations, which also pinpointed him in numerous unsolved rapes. He is currently serving six life sentences at Minnesota Correctional Facility – Stillwater in Bayport, Minnesota.

Early life 
Joseph Donald Ture Jr. was born on February 7, 1951, in St. Paul, Minnesota. His parents divorced when he was 10, and his father won custody of him, though he was primarily raised in an orphanage. In his late teens, he joined the U.S. Marine Corps, but only stayed for about six months before returning to the St. Paul area, where he held many low-skilled jobs. He was barely able to afford proper living conditions, and reportedly he spent some time living in his car.

Criminal investigation

1980s 
On October 30, 1980, Ture was arrested for the rapes of a 13-year-old Minneapolis girl and two other women. While in custody, he was questioned in the murder of Diane Edwards, 19, a University of Minnesota student whose nude and battered body was discovered near Elk River on October 3. She had been reported missing on September 26 after being seen being forced into a man's car.  At least five witnesses who witnessed Edwards' abduction described the man's vehicle as an older, rusted station wagon. This description was similar to Ture's vehicle, a 1974 Ford Galaxie.

In April 1981, Ture was convicted of rape and kidnapping involving the rape cases. He was sentenced to 30 years in prison. Afterwards, he was indicted in Edwards' murder. Based on eyewitnesses identifying him at the murder scene, Ture was convicted and sentenced to life imprisonment. After his conviction, he confessed to the 1978 murders of Alice Huling and her three children, but he quickly recanted his confessions. In 1982, Ture was attacked by several of his cellmates while imprisoned in Stillwater, and sustained a broken nose as a result. The beating occurred a few hours after Ture was placed in general population.

1990s 
Ture would have been eligible for parole in 2008; however, before that in 1996, a grand jury indicted him for the 1979 murder of Marlys Wohlenhaus, 18. After reexamining the case, investigators found that Ture provided an alibi at the time of Wohlenhaus' murder, but a new investigation showed that the alibi had been fabricated. Following the indictment, Ture agreed to be interviewed on 48 Hours, during which he professed his innocence. Days after the interview aired, numerous young women contacted the program claiming to recognize Ture as a man who sexually assaulted them in the 1970s. It was found that most of these sexual assault victims had worked as waitresses, and police believe Ture had stalked them for weeks leading up the assault. 

In 1997, Ture was convicted of Wohlenhaus' murder and was given an additional life sentence. During his imprisonment, Ture allegedly bragged to his cellmate about committing the 1979 killing of Joan Bierschbach, 20. In 1999, Ture was indicted in the Huling family murders, and in 2000 was sentenced to life imprisonment. Ture claims he is innocent in all the murder cases and claims that investigators used him to solve cold cases.

Murder cases 
 On the morning of December 15, 1978, an intruder broke into the home of 36-year-old Alice Huling in Clearwater. Huling was shot to death by Ture, before he went to her children's beds, tying all four of them up and shooting them; 16-year-old Susan, 12-year-old Patti, and 13-year-old Wayne, were killed, while a fourth child, 11-year-old William "Billy", was the only one who survived. Four days after the mass murder, police arrested Ture at a pizzeria after he had been seen driving a stolen car. After a search of the car, police confiscated a ski mask, but was not linked to the murders.

 On May 8, 1979, 18-year-old Marlys Ann Wohlenhaus was returning home after leaving her high school. Upon entering her home, an intruder who had broken in and waited for her to come home, attacked her. He beat her with a blunt instrument and sexually assaulted her. Later that day, Maryls' mother discovered her body. That same year and 1980, three teenage girls were lured into a man's car during separate incidents, resulting in each of them being raped.

 On September 26, 1980, a man abducted 19-year-old Diane Edwards while she was walking home from her job as a waitress at a nearby Perkins Restaurant in West St. Paul. He took her to the nearby woods, where he sexually assaulted and stabbed her to death. Four teenage girls witnessed her abduction, and identified Ture as the man they saw forcing her into his van.

In popular culture 
The documentary series Cold Case Files features the investigation into Ture's murders on season 2 episode 11 "Murder on the Menu".

The American punk rock band Hüsker Dü released the song "Diane" in 1983 which is based on the murder of Diane Edwards, Ture's last victim.

See also 
 List of serial killers in the United States

References

External links 
 To Catch A Killer

Living people
1951 births
People from Saint Paul, Minnesota
20th-century American criminals
American male criminals
Male serial killers
American people convicted of murder
American prisoners sentenced to life imprisonment
People convicted of murder by Minnesota
Prisoners sentenced to life imprisonment by Minnesota
1978 murders in the United States
1979 murders in the United States
1980 murders in the United States
Criminals from Minnesota